Steiner is a German surname (derived from Stein, meaning a stone, or rock). The name is of Bavarian origin and refers to a person dwelling near a stone, or rock boundary.  The name Steiner is common in Bavaria, Switzerland (9th most common surname ) and Austria (7th most common surname).
 Notable people with the surname include:

Abby Steiner (born 1999), American sprinter
Achim Steiner (born 1961), German expert in environmental politics
Adalbert Steiner II (1907–1984), Romanian football defender
A. L. Steiner (born 1967), American multimedia artist, author and educator
Andreas Steiner (born 1964), Austrian athlete
André Steiner (born 1970), retired German rower
Andrew Steiner (1908–2009), Czechoslovak-American architect 
Anton Steiner (born 1958), Austrian skier
April Steiner Bennett (born 1980), American pole vaulter
Ben Steiner (1921–1988), American baseball player
Bernard Christian Steiner (1867-1926), United States educator, librarian and jurist
Betty Wilson Steiner-Conduit (1920–1994), Canadian psychiatrist working with transgender and intersex people
Bob Steiner (born c. 1946), Canadian football player 
Brandon Steiner (born 1959), American sports marketer
Catherine Steiner-Adair, American clinical psychologist and school consultant
Cecil C. Steiner (1896–1989), American orthodontist
Charley Steiner (born 1949), American sportscaster
Christian Steiner (1843–1880), German-born American soldier in the U.S. Army 
Christophe Steiner (born 1958), Monegasque politician
Claude Steiner (born 1935), clinical psychologist and transactional analyst
David Steiner (AIPAC), American real estate developer, former President of the American Israel Public Affairs Committee
David Eduard Steiner (1811-1860), Swiss painter 
David J. Steiner (1965-2016), American documentary filmmaker, educator and political activist
David P. Steiner (born 1960), American businessman and director for Vulcan Materials
Daniel Steiner (born 1973), Austrian actor and film director
Derik Steiner (born 1987), American football fullback
Donald Frederick Steiner (1930–2014), American biochemist and professor
Douglas Craig Steiner, American Brooklyn-based real estate developer
Elio Steiner (1904–1965), Italian stage and film actor
Elizabeth Steiner Hayward (born c. 1963), American Democratic member of the Oregon Senate
Elsa Steiner (born 1968), French film, TV, and stage actress
Emma Roberto Steiner (1856–1929), American composer and conductor
Endre Steiner (1901–1944), Hungarian-born chess player
Felix Steiner (1896–1966), German Waffen-SS officer
Ferdinand Steiner, gymnast from Bohemia
Ferenc Steiner (born 1888, date of death unknown), Hungarian cyclist
Frances Steiner (born 1937), American conductor, cellist and professor emeritus
Franz Baermann Steiner (1909–1952), German/Czech anthropologist, polymath and poet
Fred Steiner (1923–2011), American composer
Gabriel Steiner (1883,-1965), German-American neurologist known for his research of multiple sclerosis
George Steiner (1929-2020), literary critic
Gerolf Steiner (1908–2009),  German zoologist
Gitta Steiner (1932–1990), American composer
Giuseppe Steiner (disambiguation), several people
Guenther Steiner, Italian motorsport engineer and manager
H. Steiner, Austro-Hungarian Klezmer violinist of the early twentieth century
Hans Steiner (born 1946), Austrian professor of Psychiatry & Behavioral Sciences, Child & Adolescent Psychiatry 
Heidemarie Steiner (born 1944), German figure skater and coach
Heinrich Steiner (1911–2009), German painter and printmaker 
Helen Steiner Rice (1900–1981), American writer of religious and inspirational poetry
Henry Steiner (born 1934), Austrian graphic designer, best known for his corporate identity designs
Shelley Steiner (born 1961), Canadian Olympic fencer
Helena de Figueiredo Steiner (born 1953), Brazilian judge, member of the International Criminal Court since 2003
Herman Steiner (1905–1955), American chess champion, organizer, and columnist
Herman G. Steiner (1897–1982), American sports coach
Hermann Steiner (1913-2005), Swiss inventor and businessman
Hillel Steiner, Canadian professor of political philosophy
Hugo Steiner, Swiss endocrinologist
Jacqueline Steiner (1924–2019), American folk singer, songwriter and social activist
Jean-François Steiner, French-Jewish writer 
Jakob Steiner (1796–1863), Swiss geometer and mathematician, cf. Steiner tree
Jacob D. Steiner] (1861-date of death unknown), American member of the South Dakota House of Representatives
Jeffrey Steiner (1937-2008), Austrian CEO of the Fairchild Corporation
Jerry Steiner (1918–2012), American professional basketball player
Joan C. Steiner (1943–2010), American illustrator and puzzle designer
John Steiner (born 1941), English actor
John Steiner (psychoanalyst) (born 1934), author and trainer at the British Psychoanalytical Society
John Michael Steiner (1925-2014), Czech-American sociologist and Holocaust researcher
Josef Steiner (born 1950), Austrian long-distance runner
Joshua Steiner (born ca. 1980), Colorado author in science fiction
Josy Gyr-Steiner (1949–2007), Swiss politician and member of the Swiss National Council (2003–2007)
Karel Steiner, Czech footballer
Karlo Štajner (1902-1992), Austrian-Yugoslav communist activist and prominent gulag survivor
Kate Stilley Steiner, American award-winning filmmaker, editor, and producer
Kenneth Donald Steiner (born 1936), American Catholic auxiliary bishop
Kilian von Steiner (1833–1903), German banker and industrialist
Lajos Steiner (1903–1975), Hungarian–born Australian chess master
Leo Steiner (c. 1939–1987), Jewish American restaurateur 
Leonardo Ulrich Steiner (born 1950), Brazilian Catholic archbishop 
Lewis Henry Steiner (1827–1892), American physician and librarian
Liliana Fernández Steiner (born 1987), Spanish beach volleyball player
Linda Claire Steiner (born 1950), American academic and journalist
Lisa Steiner, Austrian-born American immunologist and professor at the Massachusetts Institute of Technology
Lisl Steiner (born 1927), Austrian-American photojournalist and documentary filmmaker
Manfred Steiner (born 1962), Austrian former ski jumper
Marc Steiner, American radio talk show and podcast host
Maria Steiner, Austrian honored as one of the Righteous Among the Nations
Marie Steiner-von Sivers (1867–1948), second wife and close colleague of Rudolf Steiner 
Mario Steiner (born 1982), Austrian football midfielder
Mark Steiner (born 1942), professor of philosophy of mathematics and physics at the Hebrew University of Jerusalem
Matthias Steiner (born 1982), Austrian-German weightlifter
Max Steiner (1888–1971), Hollywood film composer
Maximilian Steiner (1839–1880), Austrian actor and theatre manager
Mel Steiner (1916–1997), American professional baseball umpire 
Michael Steiner (born 1949), German diplomat, head of the UN Mission in Kosovo (UNMIK)
Monika Steiner (born 1972), Swiss-born artist and sculptor 
Nancy Steiner, American costume designer
Pál Steiner (born 1953), Hungarian politician, mayor of the 5th district of Budapest (2002-2006)
Paul Steiner (born 1957), German football player
Paul Steiner (language creator), German volapükist
Pavol Steiner (1908-1969), Czechoslovak/Slovak Olympic water polo player and cardiac surgeon
Peter Steiner (cartoonist), American cartoonist, painter and novelist
Peter "Cool Man" Steiner (1917–2007), music-making Swiss advertising character
Peter Otto Steiner (1922–2010), American economist and former President of the American Association of University Professors
Philipp Steiner (born 1986), Austrian football defender
Ralph Steiner (1899–1986), American photographer
Ray G. Steiner, a retired American basketball player
Rebel Roy Steiner, Sr. (1927–2014). American football offensive end 
Red Steiner (1915–2001), American baseball player
Richard C Steiner (born 1945), Professor of Semitics at Yeshiva University
Rick Steiner (born 1961), ring name of American professional wrestler Robert Rechsteiner
Richard Harris Steiner (1946–2016), American five-time Tony Award-winning Broadway producer
Robert Steiner (disambiguation)
Roland A. Steiner (c. 1840-1906), American physician, planter, folklorist, and amateur archaeologist
Rolf Steiner (born 1933), German soldier of fortune
Ronald John Steiner (1938–2015), American football and baseball coach
Roswitha Steiner (born 1963), Austrian alpine skier
Rubin Steiner (né Frédérick Landier; 1974), French DJ, guitar, bass, and keyboard musician
Rudolf Steiner (disambiguation), several people
Rudolf Steiner (1861–1925), Austrian writer and spiritual leader, founder of anthrosophy and related movements
Samuel Ray Delany Jr. (born 1942), American author and literary critic
Scott Steiner (born 1962), ring name of American professional wrestler Scott Rechsteiner
Scott A. Steiner (born 1973), Judge of the Orange County Superior Court in California 
Sigfrit Steiner (1906–1988), Swiss actor
Stan Steiner (1925–1987), American historian and teacher
Stjepan Steiner (1915–2006), Croatian physician, cardiologist and personal physician of Josip Tito
 Thomas Steiner (director), Austrian experimental film director, and painter
 Thomas Steiner (politician), Austrian politician*Tim Steiner (born 1965), British composer 
Tim Steiner (businessman) (born 1969), British businessman, CEO of Ocado
Tito Steiner (born 1952), Argentine decathlete
Tommy Shane Steiner (born 1973), American country music artist
Udo Steiner (born 1939), Judge at the Federal Constitutional Court of Germany from 1995 to 2007
Victor Steiner, Sr., Salvadoran scouting official
Vicky Steiner (born 1956), American politician, member of the North Dakota House of Representatives 
Walter Steiner (born 1951), Swiss ski jumper
Walter Steiner (rower) (born 1946), Swiss rower
Wernher Steiner (1492–1542), military chaplain and chronicler of the Swiss history
William Steiner (born 1937), American politician and child advocate
Yeshaya Steiner (1851–1925), rabbi, founder of the Kerestir Hasidic dynasty
Zara Steiner, FBA (née Shakow; born 1928), American-born British historian and academic

Fictional characters 
Adelbert Steiner, fictional character from the video game Final Fantasy IX
Friedrich Steiner, fictional Nazi scientist and antagonist from the video game Call of Duty: Black Ops
House Steiner, fictional Inner Sphere family from the BattleTech game franchise
Kurt Steiner, fictional Oberst (Colonel) in the German Fallschirmjäger (Paratroopers) in the John Sturges directed World War II film The Eagle Has Landed
Rion Steiner, fictional character and protagonist of the video game Galerians
Rolf Steiner, fictional German Platoon Sergeant in the Sam Peckinpah directed World War II film Cross of Iron
Rudy Steiner, fictional character of the book The Book Thief

References

German-language surnames